The  is a limited express train service in Japan operated by Central Japan Railway Company (JR Central), which runs from Nagoya to Shingū and Kii-Katsuura. Traveling the entire 246 km (152.9 mi) journey from Nagoya to Kii-Katsuura takes just under four hours, whilst the 231.1 km (143.6 mi) section from Nagoya to Shingu takes approximately three and a half hours. As a limited express service, passengers must purchase a limited express ticket on top of the basic fare ticket to use the train.

History
The service was first introduced on 2 October 1972.
Until February 18, 1989, the Nanki was operated by KiHa 80 Diesel Multiple Units (DMUs),  until their replacement by KiHa 85 DMUs. Nanki services are sometimes called Wide View Nanki because of their large viewing windows that offer uninterrupted views of the track and scenery at the front of the train, as is the case with other JR Central Limited Express services operated with 383 series, 373 series or KiHa 85 series trains.

Route
The train stops at the following stations:

 -  -  -  - -  -  -  -  -  -  -  -  - 

Between Yokkaichi and Tsu, the train runs along the private Ise Railway Ise Line. An additional fee is required to ride the train in this section.

The section of the route between Shingū and Kii-Katsuura is operated by JR West.

Stations in brackets are only served on the day of the annual Formula 1 Grand Prix race at Suzuka Circuit.

Service
There are 4 daily departures in each direction. There are 4 departures from Nagoya, 3 of which run to Kii-Katsuura, with the last service of the day terminating at Shingu. 3 services begin at Kii-Katsuura and run to Nagoya. The earliest Nagoya-bound service begins at Shingu.
The Nanki is generally formed of KiHa 85 units in 4 car formations, but sometimes it may operate in 5 or 6 car formations, especially during busy seasons and days of large events, like the Formula 1 Grand Prix, which is held at Suzuka Circuit every October.

Facilities
Only standard class is available on this service. The Green car (first class) was removed from all services on 1 November 2020, due to declining ridership. Seat reservations can be made for an extra fee. There are one or more universal access toilets, as well as normal toilets, depending on how many cars are being used. There are also wheelchair spaces. Onboard catering services ceased on 16 March 2013. There is a vending machine onboard, which provides a small selection of drinks. Complimentary WiFi is also available.

Plans
In September 2020, JR Central announced that as a result of declining ridership in the past 3 years, due to the development of the Kisei Highway, changes will be made to the car formations. On 1 November 2020, the number of cars forming regular services was reduced from 4-6 to 2-3, with the Green car (first class) also being removed from all services. The frequency of services remain the same; 4 workings a day in each direction. The KiHa 85 DMUs are scheduled to be progressively replaced by new HC85 Hybrid units in 2022.

References

Named passenger trains of Japan
Central Japan Railway Company
Railway services introduced in 1972